The American Marketing Association (AMA) is a professional association for marketing professionals with 30,000 members as of 2012. It has 76 professional chapters and 250 collegiate chapters across the United States.

It also publishes a number of handbooks and research monographs. The AMA publishes the Journal of Marketing, Journal of Marketing Research, Journal of Public Policy and Marketing, Journal of International Marketing, and Marketing News. It sponsors the collegiate honor society Alpha Mu Alpha.

Organization
The American Marketing Association has a board of directors that are elected annually by its members and a set of councils that are appointed. The headquarters is located in Chicago.

History
At a 1915 convention of the Associated Advertising Clubs of the World, a group of advertising teachers established the National Association of Teachers of Advertising (NATA). Initial discussions revolved around the definition of advertising and the study of advertising. The group's name changed to National Association of Teachers of Marketing & Advertising (NATMA) and then National Association of Teachers of Marketing (NATM) as its focus expanded to marketing, incorporating educators from a variety of disciplines, including economics and accounting.

Approximately 15 years later a second organization, the American Marketing Society (AMS), was founded dedicated to the science of marketing. Lewis and Owen explained the first president, Paul Nystrom, "expressed a need to find ways of lowering the cost of marketing, a concern for criticisms against marketing, and an interest in finding 'useful tools and devices in marketing practice'".

The two organizations jointly published the Journal of Marketing in 1936 and merged in 1937 to form the American Marketing Association. The association was housed at the University of Illinois in its early years and eventually moved its headquarters to Chicago as its professional staff expanded. As the study and practice of marketing became more sophisticated and specialized, the AMA also provided new offerings with the launch of the Journal of Marketing Research (1964) and acquisitions of Journal of Public Policy & Marketing from the University of Michigan in 1990, and Journal of International Marketing from Michigan State University in 1997.

See also
List of fellows of the American Marketing Association

References

External links
www.ama.org – AMA website for professional marketers

Professional associations based in the United States
Marketing organizations
Marketing in the United States